Aaouainat    is a town in Akkar Governorate, Lebanon.

The population  is mostly Greek Orthodox and Maronite.

History
In 1838, Eli Smith noted  the village as el-'Aweinat,  located east of esh-Sheikh Mohammed. The  inhabitants were  Greek Orthodox and Maronite.

References

Bibliography

External links
Aaouainat, Localiban 

Populated places in Akkar District
Eastern Orthodox Christian communities in Lebanon
Maronite Christian communities in Lebanon